Auto AG Schwyz (AAGS) is a company based in Schwyz, Switzerland which provides bus services to the Canton of Schwyz. The company operates commercial daytime services throughout the Canton, and its vehicles venture into the neighbouring Canton of Lucerne during the night when it operates the N10 service on the Nachstern network, in conjunction with Verkehrsbetriebe Luzern. The company currently runs 28 buses.

Fleet
As of January 2014 the fleet consisted of 50+ vehicles

Livery
Auto AG Schwyz vehicles are painted in a livery of red and white.

External links
Official site

Bus companies of Switzerland
Transport in the canton of Schwyz
Public transport in Switzerland